First Lesson (translit. Parvi urok) is a 1960 Bulgarian drama film directed by Rangel Vulchanov and starring Korneliya Bozhanova. It was entered into the 1960 Cannes Film Festival.

Cast
 Korneliya Bozhanova as Violeta
 Georgi Naumov as Pesho
 Georgi Georgiev-Getz as Bratat na Pesho
 Georgi Kaloyanchev as Vaskata
 Konstantin Kotsev as Assistant

References

External links

1960 films
1960s Bulgarian-language films
1960 drama films
Bulgarian black-and-white films
Films directed by Rangel Vulchanov
Films directed by Vladimir Petrov
Bulgarian drama films